Ahmadabad-e Sofla (also Romanized as Aḩmadābād-e Soflá; also known as Aḩmadābād-e Pā’īn) is a village in Abarghan Rural District, in the Central District of Sarab County, East Azerbaijan Province, Iran. At the 2006 census, its population was 416, in 78 families.

References 

Populated places in Sarab County